Jawai Vikat Ghene Aahe is an Indian Marathi language television series which aired on Zee Marathi. The series premiered from 3 March 2014 by replacing Radha Hi Bawari.

Cast 
 Tanvi Palav as Pranjal
 Niranjan Kulkarni as Raya
 Savita Prabhune as Veena Pradhan
 Ashalata Wabgaonkar
 Umesh Damle
 Sneha Raikar
 Milind Phatak
 Sachin Deshpande
 Kanchan Gupte
 Madhavi Nimkar
 Nupur Daithankar

References

External links 
 

Marathi-language television shows
Zee Marathi original programming
2014 Indian television series debuts
2015 Indian television series endings